The Bailiwick of Jersey, a crown dependency in the Channel Islands, off the French coast of Normandy, has two official languages: English and French. Traditionally, Jèrriais, a variety of the ancient Norman language, has been the dominant language of the Bailiwick, but the past century has seen a great decline in its usage, as well as in the use of French.

Statistics

English

As a crown dependency of the British monarch, English has a special place in the island, and is now the dominant, as well as an official, language.

The English language has been allowed in parliamentary debates in the States of Jersey since February 2, 1900.

Most signs are written in English, sometimes with French or Jèrriais subtitling. There are around 107,000 people in Jersey, and 20% are of British (traditionally English-speaking) descent. Most of the Norman-descended population now speaks English as well. All demographics combined, English is spoken by 94.6% of the population.

French
Jersey Legal French is the official variety of French used in administration. The States of Jersey is part of the Assemblée parlementaire de la Francophonie. The current use of French in the parliament is generally restricted to formalities (prayers, ceremonies, formulae).

Due to proximity, there has been a French-speaking community in Jersey for centuries, though now it has shrunk considerably, although the language is still official. The national anthem, "Ma Normandie", is in the French language. At various points in history the indigenous French-speaking population of Jersey was supplemented by political refugees from France, including for example Victor Hugo.

The last French-language newspaper in Jersey, Les Chroniques de Jersey, closed at the end of 1959.

Jèrriais

Jèrriais, sometimes referred to as "Jersey French" or "Jersey Norman French", a variety of Norman, was the dominant language of the Bailiwick for most of its history. Now, however, the language is spoken by around 2,600 of the 87,000 inhabitants of the island, down from 5,720 in 1989. The language is most prominent in rural areas, where the proportions of speakers are highest, although the capital, Saint Helier, has the highest total number of speakers. Around 200 children are learning the language in schools as of 2006, and the Jersey Evening Post, the island's main newspaper, runs articles in Jèrriais every week. Up to 15% of the island has some understanding of the language.

Sercquiais, a descendant of Jèrriais spoken by settlers from Jersey in Sark, is also near the brink of extinction, with fewer than 20 native speakers.

Portuguese
Immigrants of Portuguese (mostly Madeiran) ethnicity make up 9.4% of Jersey  and 8.4% of the total population spoke the language, as first or second language, in 2011, and is commonly used in signage, notices, and the like.

British Sign
The Deaf community on Jersey use British Sign Language.

See also
Jèrriais literature

References

External links
 Jersey Government Language Page and Links (Jèrriais)

Jersey culture
Languages of the Channel Islands